Carpophilus obsoletus is a species of sap-feeding beetle in the family Nitidulidae. It is found in Africa, Europe and Northern Asia (excluding China), North America, and Southern Asia.

References

Further reading

External links

 

Nitidulidae
Articles created by Qbugbot
Beetles described in 1843